Symmoca signatella is a moth of the family Autostichidae. It is known from most of western Europe, but also Lithuania, Croatia, Greece and southern Russia. It has also been recorded from California in North America.

The wingspan is 12–15 mm. The forewings are whitish cinereous (ash grey), speckled with brownish fuscous. The hindwings are greyish brown. Adults are on wing in late summer and autumn.

The larvae feed on dried vegetable matter. They have been recorded feeding on dry leaves and plant debris on the stem and branches of Rosmarinus officinalis. The accumulation of debris was connected by light webbing.

References

External links
Images representing Symmoca signatella at Consortium for the Barcode of Life

Moths described in 1854
Symmoca
Moths of Europe